The Monmouthshire flag is the flag of the historic county of Monmouth. It was registered with the Flag Institute as the official flag of the county in 2011 although its origins date back to the 6th century.


History

The arms are those attributed by medieval heralds to King Inyr of the Welsh Kingdom of Gwent, from which Monmouthshire, once known as Wentset and Wentsland, descends. The County Council of Monmouth were first granted the arms in 1948 and they have been incorporated into the arms of other bodies over the succeeding years. This is a pattern long associated with Monmouthshire and it is also used today in the shield of the Diocese of Monmouth and in those of Monmouthshire Council, Blaenau Gwent Council and the Monmouthshire County RFC.

Design
The pantone colours for the flag are:
Black
Blue 300
Yellow 108

Armorial banner

Monmouthshire Council, which administers the principal area of Monmouthshire in the eastern part of the traditional county, uses a white banner charged with its coat of arms.

Gallery

External links
[ Flag Institute – Monmouthshire]
The Monmouthshire Association – The Monmouthshire flag

References

History of Monmouthshire
Monmouthshire
Monmouthshire